ITS, its or it's may refer to:

Language
 It's, an English contraction of it is or it has
 Its (pronoun), the possessive form of the pronoun it

Arts and entertainment
 Improvisational Tribal Style, a subgenre of Tribal Style belly dance
 It's (EP), by Teen Top, 2012

Businesses
 Illinois Traction System, an American railroad
 Industrial Tomography Systems, a manufacturer of process visualization systems based upon the principles of tomography
 International Transportation Service, an American container terminal company

Education
 Indian Theological Seminary, an interdenominational seminary in India
 Sepuluh Nopember Institute of Technology (Institut Teknologi Sepuluh Nopember), a public engineering university in Surabaya, Indonesia
 Institute for Transport Studies, University of Leeds (ITS Leeds)
 Institute of Technological Studies, Sri Lanka
 Institute of Technology, Sligo, Ireland
 Institute of Transportation Studies, University of California Berkeley, Davis, Irvine and Los Angeles

Organizations
 Identity, Tradition, Sovereignty, a former political grouping in the European Parliament
 Indian Telecommunication Service, an organised civil service of Government of India
 Indian Trade Service
 International Thespian Society, an honorary organization for high school and middle school theatre students
 International Tracing Service
 International trade secretariat
 International Typographers' Secretariat, a former international trade secretariat
 Irish Texts Society, promoting the study of literature
 Irish Thoracic Society
 Islamic Texts Society, an educational charity based in Cambridge, UK
 Islamic Thinkers Society
 Individualists Tending to the Wild, an eco-extremist terrorist group in Mexico

Science and technology

Computing
 Incompatible Timesharing System, a computer operating system
 Intelligent tutoring system, an artificial intelligence system used for tutoring
 Internationalization Tag Set, a W3C recommendation for internationalizing XML
 Issue tracking system, computer software that manages product issues

Other science and technology
 Inverse transform sampling, a method for generating random numbers from various probability distribution
 Integrated Truss Structure, a component of the International Space Station
 Intelligent transportation system, transportation infrastructure information technology
 Internal transcribed spacer, a section of DNA located within a set of ribosomal genes
 Interplanetary Transport System, a project by SpaceX to develop a system capable of transporting humans and cargo to Mars and other destinations in space
 Interrupted time series, a time series of data known to be affected by interventions

See also
 International Temperature Scale of 1990 (ITS-90), a temperature calibration standard for measurements in units of kelvin and degrees Celsius
 Network 10, which launched as the Independent Television System